Ealdbeorht (or Alberht) was a medieval Bishop of Dunwich.

Ealdbeorht was consecrated sometime before 731 and died after that date.

References

External links
 

Bishops of Dunwich (ancient)